This is a list of Swedish football transfers in the winter transfer window 2020–21 by club.

Only transfers in and out between 8 January – 31 March 2021 of the Allsvenskan are included.

Allsvenskan

AIK

In:

Out:

BK Häcken

In:

Out:

Degerfors IF

In:

Out:

Djurgårdens IF

In:

Out:

Halmstads BK

In:

Out:

Hammarby IF

In:

Out:

IF Elfsborg

In:

Out:

IFK Göteborg

In:

Out:

IFK Norrköping

In:

Out:

IK Sirius

In:

Out:

Kalmar FF

In:

Out:

Malmö FF

In:

Out:

Mjällby AIF

In:

Out:

Varbergs BoIS

In:

Out:

Örebro SK

In:

Out:

Östersunds FK

In:

Out:

References

Trans
Trans
2020-21
Sweden